Ineke De Moortel  is a Belgian applied mathematician in Scotland, where she is a professor of applied mathematics at the University of St Andrews, director of research in the School of Mathematics and Statistics at St Andrews, and president of the Edinburgh Mathematical Society. Her research concerns the computational and mathematical modelling of solar physics, and particularly of the sun's corona.

Education and career
De Moortel earned a master's degree in mathematics in 1997 at KU Leuven. She completed a Ph.D. in solar physics in 2001 at the University of St Andrews; her dissertation, Theoretical & Observational Aspects of Wave Propagation in the Solar Corona, was supervised by Alan Hood. She remained at St Andrews as a postdoctoral researcher and research fellow, becoming a reader there in 2008 and a professor in 2013. Since 2019 she has been a member of the editorial board at the journal Monthly Notices of the Royal Astronomical Society. De Moortel sits on the judging panel for the St Andrews Prize for the Environment.

Recognition
In 2005, De Moortel became a Fellow of the Royal Astronomical Society.
In 2009 she won the Philip Leverhulme Prize in Astronomy and Astrophysics.
She was elected to the Royal Society of Edinburgh in 2015, and previously co-chaired its affiliate society, the Young Academy of Scotland.

References

External links
Home page

Year of birth missing (living people)
Living people
Belgian mathematicians
Scottish mathematicians
Women mathematicians
KU Leuven alumni
Alumni of the University of St Andrews
Academics of the University of St Andrews
Fellows of the Royal Astronomical Society
Fellows of the Royal Society of Edinburgh